Okulovskaya is a rural locality (a village) in Yavengskoye Rural Settlement, Vozhegodsky District, Vologda Oblast, Russia. The population was 15 as of 2002.

Geography 
The distance to Vozhega is 26.5 km, to Baza is 10 km. Repnyakovskaya, Lupachikha, Karpovskaya, Levkovskaya are the nearest rural localities.

References 

Rural localities in Vozhegodsky District